Francisco Candel Tortajada (May 31, 1925 in Casas Altas – November 23, 2007 in Barcelona, Spain), usually known as well as Paco Candel, was a Valencian-born writer and journalist who lived most of his life in Barcelona.

He was born in a town of the Spanish-speaking comarca of Rincón de Ademuz, Valencia. When he was a little child, his family moved to Barcelona.

Most of his contributions are devoted to studying the 20th-century Spanish migrations in the Barcelona metropolitan area.

The book which made him famous was Els altres catalans (The Other Catalans in Catalan), a journalistic and sociological study about the immigration, which heavily influenced final decisions of the Assemblea de Catalunya in 1971.
He wrote severals novels, tales, essays and articles. He also collaborated in several newspapers and magazines such as Tele/eXprés, Serra d'Or or Avui. He collaborated with Unified Socialist Party of Catalonia (PSUC). In 1977, he was elected as senator in the Spanish Courts for Barcelona demarcation in Entesa dels Catalans candidature. In 1979, he became town councilor of Hospitalet de Llobregat as independent for PSUC, where he assumed the Culture department.

In 1983 he received the Creu de Sant Jordi. In 2003, Generalitat de Catalunya conceded him its Golden Medal.

He died, after a long illness.

Selected works 

 1956: Hay una juventud que aguarda (There is a youth which awaits)
 1957: Donde la ciudad cambia su nombre (Where the city changes its name)
 1959: Han matado a un hombre, han roto el paisaje (They have killed a man, they have broken the landscape)
 1964: Els altres catalans (The other Catalans)
 1967: Parlem-ne (Let's talk about it)
 1973: Encara més sobre els altres catalans (Even more about the other Catalans)
 1979: Un charnego en el Senado (A charnego in the Senate)
 1981: El Candel contra Candel (Candel vs Candel)
 1985: Els altres catalans vint anys després (The other Catalans twenty years later)
 1988: La nova pobresa (The new poverty)

External links 

 Paco Candel Foundation 
 Piece of news about his decease 
 Website about Francisco Candel's books  

1925 births
2007 deaths
Catalan-language writers
Spanish male writers
Journalists from Catalonia